Viki Shock (born 8 April 1975, in Prague) is a Czech writer and artist best known for his avant-garde and experimental writings and his involvement in the Czech underground. His texts draw heavily upon the traditions of pataphysics, Dadaism, Surrealism, and Absurdist fiction.

Life and work 
Born and raised in Prague, Shock graduated from a technical school in 1995 and worked successively as a mechanic, sanitary technician, librarian, porter, production assistant at Czech Television, and a proofreader, copywriter, and editor at the media agency Mediafax, while at the same time engaging in numerous artistic and underground pursuits. In addition to having several poetry collections published, he published at his own expense the literary magazine Karpatské příčiny (1994–95), was a member of the music group Ironická mozek (1993–1996 and 2002–2005), operated the samizdat/underground publishing house THC Review from 1997 to 2004, which published some 31 books, in print runs of five to 30 copies, of “cannabis crazypoetry.” In 2008 his drawings and collages were exhibited at the Galerie Smečky in Prague. More recently, he worked for a couple of years as a gardener in the Liboc-Vokovice, Bubeneč and Malvazinky cemeteries in Prague, an experience which formed the basis for his novel Zahradníkův rok na hřbitově, and studied at the Hussite Theological Faculty at Charles University in Prague, from which he earned an M.A. in 2020. In that same year a retrospective collection of his poetry, V předsíni dýchal idiot [In the Vestibule Breathed an Idiot], was published.
 
Shock also regularly contributes to Czech journals such as Babylon, Dobrá adresa, Přítomnost, Pražský patriot, Psí víno, Reflex and Tvar. His translation of H.P. Lovecraft’s Fungi from Yuggoth was published in 2019.

Works 
 Dvacet deka něžností (poetry, 1997)
 Dvakrát opakované ňadro (poetry, 1999; 2nd edition 2003)
 Karel Bodlák – Květy bodláčí (prose and poetry, 2001)
 Pozdrav z Pandemonia (poetry, 2002)
 Negropolis aneb Irracionálno dobyto! (poetry, 2003)
 Poddůstojníky (poetry, 2003)
 Tiché odpoledne na zaprášené půdě (2006)
 Zahradníkův rok na hřbitově (novel, 2014)
 Sněhurka, jakou svět neviděl! (prose and poetry, 2015)
 V předsíni dýchal idiot (selected works and drawings, 2020)

References

External links
 English-language biography at the Czech Literary Centre (Moravian Library) website
 "The Last Mournful Summer of Mr Pip" -- excerpt from Zahradníkův rok na hřbitově (The Cafe Irreal)
 THC Review and the Condemned Past -- article about THC Review (Umělec magazine)
 Couch Potato by Trade -- short essay (Umělec magazine)

Czech poets
Czech male poets
Writers from Prague
1975 births
Living people
Punk literature
Charles University alumni